Thomas Wandschneider (born 7 November 1963 in Buxtehude) is a German Para-badminton player. He is a four time Para badminton world champion. He considered retiring, but changed his mind due to Badminton being at the 2020 Summer Paralympics.

Wandschneider is also a 14-time gold medalist at the European Para-Badminton Championships.

Achievements

World Championships 

Men's singles

Men's doubles

Mixed doubles

European Championships 
Men's singles

Men's doubles

BWF Para Badminton World Circuit (1 title, 4 runners-up) 
The BWF Para Badminton World Circuit – Grade 2, Level 1, 2 and 3 tournaments has been sanctioned by the Badminton World Federation from 2022.

Men's singles

Men's doubles

International Tournaments (13 titles, 9 runners-up) 
Men's singles

Men's doubles

Doubles

References

External links

Notes 

1963 births
Living people
German male badminton players
German para-badminton players
Paralympic badminton players of Germany
Badminton players at the 2020 Summer Paralympics
Sportspeople from Lower Saxony